João Diogo Fonseca Ferreira (born 22 March 2001) is a Portuguese professional footballer who plays for Watford as a right-back.

Football career
Born in Póvoa de Varzim, Ferreira made his professional debut with Benfica B in a 2–1 win over Estoril Praia in LigaPro on 11 August 2019. On 25 January 2021, he made his debut with the first team in a Primeira Liga 1–1 draw against Nacional.

On 31 August 2021, he joined Vitória de Guimarães on a season-long loan with an option to purchase for €5 million.

On 9 January 2023, Ferriera joined EFL Championship club Watford for an undisclosed fee. He made his league debut on 14 January 2023 as a half time substitute in a 2-0 win against Blackpool and scored the equalising goal in a 1-1 draw against Rotherham a week later in what was his first start for the club.

Career statistics

Honours
Benfica
 UEFA Youth League runner-up: 2019–20

References

External links

2001 births
Living people
People from Póvoa de Varzim
Portuguese footballers
Portugal youth international footballers
Association football defenders
S.L. Benfica B players
S.L. Benfica footballers
Vitória S.C. players
Rio Ave F.C. players
Liga Portugal 2 players
Primeira Liga players
Sportspeople from Porto District

Watford F.C. players
Portuguese expatriate footballers
Portuguese expatriate sportspeople in England